Shin Sang-whi (born 14 July 2000) is a South Korean football midfielder who plays for Gimhae FC.

References

2000 births
Living people
Association football midfielders
South Korean footballers
Suwon Samsung Bluewings players
K League 1 players